The Children of Genghis is a 2017 Mongolian drama film directed by Zolbayar Dorj. It was selected as the Mongolian entry for the Best Foreign Language Film at the 90th Academy Awards, but it was not nominated.

Plot
A young boy in the Mongolian countryside trains for a horse race.

Cast
 Brittany Belt as Sarah Jones ( UNICEF officer)
 Ankhnyam Ragchaa as Tsetsegee (Dambii's wife)
 Batmend Baast as Dambii

See also
 List of submissions to the 90th Academy Awards for Best Foreign Language Film
 List of Mongolian submissions for the Academy Award for Best Foreign Language Film

References

External links
 

2017 films
2017 drama films
Mongolian-language films
Mongolian drama films